Ulomini is a tribe of darkling beetles in the family Tenebrionidae. There are more than 20 genera among Ulomini.

Genera
These genera belong to the tribe Ulomini:

 Achthosus Pascoe, 1863  (Australasia)
 Alegoria Laporte, 1840  (the Neotropics)
 Antimachus Gistel, 1829  (the Neotropics)
 Apteruleda Gebien, 1928  (the Neotropics)
 Apteruloma Gebien, 1928  (the Neotropics)
 Basanopsis Gebien, 1914  (Indomalaya)
 Brachypophlaeus Fairmaire, 1897  (the Palearctic, tropical Africa, and Indomalaya)
 Cenoscelis Wollaston, 1868  (the Palearctic, tropical Africa, Indomalaya, and Australasia)
 Cneocnemis Gebien, 1914  (the Palearctic, Indomalaya, and Australasia)
 Curtopeltoides Pic, 1916  (Indomalaya)
 Donisiellus Bremer, 1992  (tropical Africa)
 Eutochia Leconte, 1862  (North America and the Neotropics)
 Macruloma Pic, 1921  (Indomalaya)
 Metabolocerus Bates, 1873  (the Neotropics)
 Microcenoscelis Schawaller, 2015  (tropical Africa)
 Neooligocara Guerrero, Vidal & Moore, 2007  (the Neotropics)
 Neopsectropus Kaszab, 1941  (tropical Africa)
 Oligocara Solier, 1848  (the Neotropics)
 Pheres Champion, 1886  (the Neotropics)
 Pycnuloma Fairmaire, 1896  (Indomalaya)
 Scotochares Boheman, 1858  (Oceania)
 Semieutochia Kaszab, 1980  (Indomalaya)
 Typhluloma Lea, 1912  (Australasia)
 Uleda Laporte, 1840  (the Neotropics)
 Uloma Dejean, 1821  (worldwide)
 Ulomimus Bates, 1873  (the Palearctic and Indomalaya)

References

Further reading

External links

 

Tenebrioninae